Investment Valuation: Tools and Techniques for Determining the Value of Any Asset is a textbook on valuation, corporate finance, and investment management by Aswath Damodaran. The text was initially published by John Wiley & Sons on October 11, 1995, and is now available in its third edition as a part of Wiley Finance series.

Review

—Review by Seeking Alpha

See also
Security Analysis (book)
Valuation: Measuring and Managing the Value of Companies

References

1995 non-fiction books
American non-fiction books
Finance books
Wiley (publisher) books